Enrico Pedrini (15 January 1940 in Montesano di Filighera – 19 April 2012 in Genova) was an academic, theorist and collector of Conceptual Art. He also taught epistemology in Italy.

Research and curation
Pedrini placed particular emphasis on the work of Bernar Venet, Art & Language, and Victor Burgin. His books and essays examined issues in Anthropological Art, Conceptual Art, and Possibilism, and include John Cage, Happenings and Fluxus (1986) and The Quantic Machine and the Second Avant-Garde (1991), in which he discusses the relation between quantum theory and the visual arts movements from the 1960s.

Pedrini studied the interaction of dissipating systems, chaos theory, and new potentials of art. He curated a number of international exhibitions, in venues such as Studio Oggetto in Milan, the Persano Gallery in Turin, the MAMAC in Nice, and the Williamsburg Art & Historical Center in New York City. In 1995 he curated, with Wolfgang Becker, the Taiwanese Pavilion at the 46th Venice Biennale.

Pedrini was also a keen collector of contemporary art. His collection focused on Dada, Fluxus, Minimal Art, Arte Povera, Vienna Aktionism, and Graffiti Art. 

Selected bibliography
 Irreversibility and the Avant-Garde: an Essay on Physics and Modern Culture'', 2004,

References

External links
Official website

Italian academics
Italian art collectors
Italian art curators
Italian art critics
Italian art historians
1940 births
2012 deaths